Here follows a list of children, grandchildren and great-grandchildren of George III, King of the United Kingdom and his wife, Charlotte of Mecklenburg-Strelitz. Their fifteen children include George IV of the United Kingdom, William IV of the United Kingdom, and Ernest Augustus, King of Hanover. Their grandchildren include Queen Victoria of the United Kingdom and King George V of Hanover. Their great-grandchildren include King Edward VII of the United Kingdom and Ernest Augustus, Crown Prince of Hanover.

Children

Grandchildren

Great-grandchildren

Illegitimate grandchildren
Princess Charlotte, the Prince of Wales's daughter, was, for the whole of her life, the King's only legitimate grandchild. With her death in 1817, the King's unmarried sons scrambled to find appropriate wives from among the German princesses and produce heirs to the throne; but before this, many had been content to keep mistresses or, in the cases of the Prince of Wales and the Duke of Sussex, to marry invalidly. As a result, George III and Queen Charlotte had numerous illegitimate grandchildren.

References 

George III and Queen Charlotte
George III of the United Kingdom